Notable dictionaries of the Hebrew language include:

Modern Hebrew dictionaries for native speakers
 Even-Shoshan Dictionary, compiled by Avraham Even-Shoshan, originally published in 1948-1953 as מילון חדש (Hebrew for "New Dictionary").
  , the first modern Hebrew dictionary, compiled by Eliezer Ben-Yehuda, whose first volumes were published in 1908.
 , compiled by two members of the Academy of the Hebrew Language, edited in the present tense method, published in 1995, and reprinted in 2007.

 , originally developed by the Israeli Center for Educational Technology, first published in 1997, including both a printed version and an electronic one. Currently maintained by Melingo.

Historical Hebrew dictionaries
 Historical Dictionary Project of the Hebrew Language, a research project of the Academy of the Hebrew Language.

Translation dictionaries

Historical and scholarly Hebrew translation dictionaries

Prior to the 16th century
 Agron, a 10th century lexicographical reference book by Saadia Gaon, including Arabic word translations.
 Kitāb Jāmiʿ al-Alfāẓ ("The Book of Collected Meanings"), a 10th century Hebrew-Aramaic-Arabic dictionary by David ben Abraham al-Fasi

16th century
  De Rudimentis Hebraicis, ("The fundamentals of Hebrew"), first published in 1506 by Johann Reuchlin, on the Hebrew grammar, including a Hebrew-Latin lexicon
 אוֹצַר לְשׁוֹן הַקֹּדֶשׁ, Thesaurus Linguae Sanctae, sive Lexicon Hebraicum, ("Treasury of the sacred language, or Hebrew lexicon"),  first published in 1529 by Santes Pagnino, a Hebrew Latin dictionary.
 , a Yiddish-Hebrew-Latin-German dictionary written by Elia Levita and published by Paul Fagius in 1542 in Isny

19th century

 Hebräisch-deutsches Handwörterbuch über die Schriften des Alten Testaments mit Einschluß der geographischen Nahmen und der chaldäischen Wörter beym Daniel und Esra (Hebrew-German Hand Dictionary on the Old Testament Scriptures including Geographical Names and Chaldean Words, with Daniel and Ezra), by Wilhelm Gesenius, published in 1810/1812
 A Hebrew, Latin and English Dictionary; containing all the Hebrew and Chaldee Words used in the Old Testament, by Joseph Samuel Christian Frederick Frey, published 1815 by Gale and Fenner, Paternoster-Row
 Lexicon Hebraicum et Chaldaicum cum brevi Lexico Rabbinico Philosophico, a Hebrew and Chaldean lexicon by Johannes Buxtorf, published in 1607, reprinted in Glasgow, 1824.
 Steinberg O.N. (Father to the soviet composer of classical music Maximilian Osseyevich Steinberg): Jewish and Chaldean etymological dictionary to Old Testament books. T. 1-3. Vilna: Type. L. L. Matza, 1878-1881. (A Biblical hebrew dictionary in the Russian language) Штейнберг О. Н. Еврейский и халдейский этимологический словарь к книгам Ветхого Завета. Т. 1–3. Вильна: тип. Л. Л. Маца, 1878– 1881.
 Neues Hebräisch-deutsches Handwörterbuch über das Alte Testament mit Einschluß des biblischen Chaldaismus ("New Hebrew-German hand dictionary on the Old Testament including Chaldean words"), by Wilhelm Gesenius, originally published in Leipzig in 1815. Also available as a digitized version of the 16th edition, 1915 and 18th edition reprint, from Springer Verlag, Berlin 2008, 
 Strong's Concordance, a Bible concordance first published in 1890, that indexes every word in the King James Version, including the 8674 Biblical Hebrew root words used in the Old Testament, and includes a Hebrew English dictionary.

20th century
 Brown–Driver–Briggs, A Hebrew and English Lexicon of the Old Testament, first published in 1906.
 Lexicon in Veteris Testamenti libros, a scholarly translation dictionary, consisting of "Ludwig Koehler - Dictionary of the Hebrew Old Testament in English and German", and "Walter Baumgartner - A Dictionary of the Aramaic parts of the Old Testament in English and German", published in 1953.
 Hebrew and Aramaic Lexicon of the Old Testament, an English-only version, with updates, of the Lexicon in Veteris Testamenti libros, published 1994-2000.

Modern Hebrew translation dictionaries
  ("Arabic-Hebrew Dictionary of Modern Arabic"), compiled by David Ayalon, Pessach Shinar and Moshe Brill, published by the Hebrew University, 1978
 Babylon, a computer dictionary and translation program.
 , an online Hebrew English dictionary by Melingo.
 New Hebrew-German Dictionary: with grammatical notes and list of abbreviations, compiled by Wiesen, Moses A., published by Rubin Mass, Jerusalem, in 1936
 The modern Greek-Hebrew, Hebrew-Greek dictionary, compiled by Despina Liozidou Shermister, first published in 2018
 The Oxford English Hebrew dictionary, published in 1998 by the Oxford University Press.

References

Hebrew dictionaries
Hebrew